Decades: Live in Buenos Aires is a video and audio release from the Finnish symphonic metal band Nightwish, which was recorded during the Latin American leg of the Decades: World Tour. It was released on December 6, 2019.

Track listing

Personnel
 Floor Jansen – female vocals
 Tuomas Holopainen – keyboards
 Emppu Vuorinen – guitars
 Kai Hahto – drums
 Marko Hietala – bass, male vocals
 Troy Donockley – Uilleann pipes, tin whistle, bouzouki, additional vocals, additional guitars

Production
Ville Lapeinen – director
Mikka Jusilla – mastering
Sami Jormanainen – engineer
Samu Ruuskanen – vocal editing
Marcelo Bonemi – camera
Garcia Sanchez – camera
Juan Ignacio – camera
Pablo Federico – camera
Maximiliano Sosa – camera
Alejandro Fabrri – camera
Edgardo Nuñez – camera
Julian Munarriz – camera
Federico Ariza – camera
Nicolas D'Esposito – camera
Masa Mason – camera
Leonardo Chiarenza – visual production
Guido Rodolfo Semoni, Matías Schverdfinger – producer assistant
Timo Isoaho – photography
Toxic Angel – artwork

Charts

Album charts

Video charts

References

2019 live albums
Live albums recorded in Buenos Aires
Nightwish albums